Dwight William Jensen (September 4, 1934 – February 26, 2006) was the 1978 Democratic nominee for United States Senate in Idaho. He was defeated by the Republican incumbent, Jim McClure. He died in 2006 after a long battle with supranuclear palsy and multiple system atrophy.

References

1934 births
2006 deaths
Idaho Democrats
Neurological disease deaths in New York (state)
Deaths from progressive supranuclear palsy
Deaths from multiple system atrophy